Amiga E is a programming language created by Wouter van Oortmerssen on the Amiga computer. The work on the language started in 1991 and was first released in 1993. The original incarnation of Amiga E was being developed until 1997, when the popularity of the Amiga platform dropped significantly after the bankruptcy of Amiga intellectual property owner Escom AG.

According to Wouter van Oortmerssen:"It is a general-purpose programming language, and the Amiga implementation is specifically targeted at programming system applications. [...]"In his own words:"Amiga E was a tremendous success, it became one of the most popular programming languages on the Amiga."

Overview 
Amiga E combines features from several languages but follows the original C programming language most closely in terms of basic concepts. Amiga E's main benefits are fast compilation (allowing it to be used in place of a scripting language), very readable source code, flexible type system, powerful module system, exception handling (not C++ variant), and Object-oriented programming.

Amiga E was used to create the core of the popular Amiga graphics software Photogenics.

"Hello, world" example 
A "hello world" program in Amiga E looks like this:

History

1993: The first public release of Amiga E; the first release on Aminet was in September, although the programming language source codes were published on the Amiga E mailing list at least since May.

1997: The last version of Amiga E is released (3.3a).

1999: Unlimited compiler executable of Amiga E is released.

1999: Source code of the Amiga E compiler in m68k assembler is released under the GPL.

Implementations and derivatives

Discontinued

Amiga E 
The first compiler. It was written by Wouter van Oortmerssen in the m68k assembler. It supports tools that are written in E. The compiler generates 68000 machine code directly.
Platforms: AmigaOS and compatibles.
Targets: Originally AmigaOS with 68000 CPU, but has modules that can handle 68060 architecture.
Status: Stable, mature, discontinued, source available, freeware.

CreativE 
It was created by Tomasz Wiszkowski. It is based on the GPL sources of Amiga E and adds many extensions to the compiler.
Platforms: AmigaOS and compatibles.
Targets: Like Amiga E, plus some limited support for the last generations of m68k CPUs.
Status: Stable, mature, discontinued in 2001, source available, freeware.

PowerD 
It was created by Martin Kuchinka, who cooperated with Tomasz Wiszkowski in the Amiga development group "The Blue Suns." It is derived from the Amiga E and CreativE languages but is incompatible with the former due to syntax changes.
Platforms: AmigaOS and compatibles.
Targets: AmigaOS 3.0 or newer; at least 68020 CPU+FPU or PowerPC (PPC); and 4MB of RAM.
Status: Stable, mature, closed source, freeware. The project has been dormant since 2010.

YAEC 
Written from scratch in Amiga E by Leif Salomonsson and published in 2001. It uses an external assembler and linker. The project was abandoned in favor of ECX.
Platforms: AmigaOS and compatibles.
Targets: AmigaOS 3.0 with 68020 CPU and FPU.
Status: Obsolete, unfinished, discontinued, closed source, freeware.

ECX 
A compiler and tools written from scratch by Leif Salomonsson in Amiga E, with internal functions developed in m68k and PPC assemblers. It can compile itself, supports multiple targets, and adds many extensions.
Platforms: AmigaOS compatibles and derivatives.
Targets: AmigaOS 3.0, AmigaOS 4, and MorphOS with m68k or PPC architecture.
Status: Stable, mature, open source, freeware. The project has been dormant since 2013.

RE 
RE was created by Marco Antoniazzi in PowerD. It is not fully compatible with the Amiga E.
Platforms: AmigaOS and compatibles.
Targets: AmigaOS 3.0 68020 CPU+FPU; PPC.
Status: Stable, closed source, freeware. Dormant since 2008.

Under development

Portabl E 
Created by Christopher Handley. It is a meta-compiler written from scratch in Amiga E. It can compile itself and supports multiple targets.
Platforms: AmigaOS (m68k), AmigaOS 4 (PPC), AROS, MorphOS, Linux, and Windows,
Targets: C++ and Amiga E. The Amiga E code is compatible with CreativE, and with proper settings, it can be compatible with the ECX compiler.
Status: Stable, mature, under development, closed source, freeware.

E-VO 
It is a derivative of the Amiga E compiler, written by Darren Coles. It expands upon the original language and incorporates features from the CreativE compiler.
Platforms: AmigaOS and compatibles.
Targets: Like Amiga E; AmigaOS with 68000 and 020+ CPU.
Status: Stable, mature, under development, source available, freeware.

References

External links

 Amiga E home page
 A Beginner's Guide to Amiga E  md   a  Published by Jason R. Hulance in 1997
 The original Amiga E manual (for v3.3a) – Compiler manual written by Wouter van Oortmerssen.
 Amiga E mailing list
 Amiga E packages on Aminet
 PortablE home page (a free Windows & Amiga-compatibles implementation)
 E-VO compiler on GitHub
 How the code in Amiga E – Written by Jan Stötzer, a member of Amiga Zentrum Thueringen and Neuhaus13 groups. The tutorial was published in 1994 on Aminet in AmigaGuide document format; lha archive.
 Amiga E object-oriented framework - Published by Damien Guichard in 1996.
 Absolute Beginners Amiga E code examples – Published by Edward Farrow in 1997.
 Beginner's Guide to Amiga E – Published by Jason R. Hulance in 1997; AmigaGuide format.
 System programming with Amiga E – Published by Damien Guichard in 2007; AmigaGuide format.

Procedural programming languages
Amiga development software
AmigaOS 4 software
MorphOS software
AROS software
Programming languages created in 1993
Free software
Systems programming languages